The 1957–58 British National League season was the fourth season of the British National League (1954–1960). Five teams participated in the league, and the Brighton Tigers won the championship.

British National League

Regular season

Autumn Cup

Results

References

External links
 Nottingham Panthers history site

British
1957–58 in British ice hockey
1957 in English sport
1958 in English sport
1957 in Scottish sport
1958 in Scottish sport